The 2016 World Outdoor Bowls Championship  was held at the Burnside Bowling Club in Avonhead, Christchurch, New Zealand, from 29 November to 11 December 2016.

There were eight events that determined the 2016 world champions, the men's singles, doubles, triples and fours and the women's singles, doubles, triples and fours.

Medallists

Results

Men's team (W.M.Leonard Trophy)
Top five

Women's team (Taylor Trophy)
Top five

References

 
World Outdoor Bowls Championship
Bowls in New Zealand
Sport in Christchurch
2016 in New Zealand sport
2016 in bowls
November 2016 sports events in New Zealand
December 2016 sports events in New Zealand